Jahid Mohseni (born January 25, 1971), along with his brothers Saad and Zaid Mohseni and his sister Wajma Mohseni, established MOBY Group, Afghanistan's most diverse media company with interests in television, radio, print, web and directories, IT&T, and retail. Jahid is CEO of Moby Group.

A founder of Moby, Jahid has led the creation and development of Moby Media and Afghanistan's contemporary media industry to an internationally respected, and domestically market leading multi‐outlet operation.  He has established himself as an Afghan, spreading the Dari and Pashto well beyond Afghanistan.

Prior to Moby, Jahid headed Afghan Government's Afghan Aid Co‐ordination Authority (AACA) responsible for coordinating donor assistance to Afghanistan and has over 15 years in management, development and business.

References
Edmonton Journal "UNCOVERING AFGHAN MEDIA" (March 2009)
The Baltimore Sun "Censorship blurry for Afghan TV" (Feb 2009)
Charlies Rose “A Conversation with Saad Mohseni” (January 2008)
NPR “Afghan TV Station to Fight Soap Opera Ban” (April 2008)
NPR “Emerging Afghan Media Triggering Change” (September 2007)
Marketplace/Public Radio “Radical Change on Afghanistan’s Airwaves” (October 2006)
ABC Television “Afghan TV” (November 2006)
SBS Television “Revolutionary TV (August 2005)
Washington Post “David Ignatius: What Afghans Want” (December 2008)
Washington Post “Reaching his Prime Time in Afghanistan” (September 2007)
New York Times “Amid War, Passion for TV Chefs, Soaps and Idols” (August 2007)
Time Magazine “Capitalism Comes to Afghanistan” (December 2006)
Fortune “ Cobbling a Media Empire in Kabul” (January 2006)

External links
Moby Group

Afghan businesspeople
Afghan Tajik people
1971 births
Living people